La Jolla Playhouse is an American not-for-profit, professional theatre-in-residence on the campus of the University of California, San Diego. It was founded in 1947 by Gregory Peck, Dorothy McGuire, and Mel Ferrer.

The following is a chronological list of the productions that have been staged since its inception.

1947
Angel Street by Patrick Hamilton
The Shining Hour by Keith Winter
Tonight at 8.30 ... The Astonished Heart, Fumed Oak, Still Life by Noël Coward
Biography by S. N. Behrman
The Guardsman by Ferenc Molnár
The Hasty Heart by John Patrick
Dear Ruth by Norman Krasna
Night Must Fall by Emlyn Williams

1948
The Male Animal by James Thurber and Elliott Nugent
Rope by Patrick Hamilton
Serena Blandish (The Difficulty of Getting Married) by S. N. Behrman
Ultra-Marine by Peter Blackmore
The Glass Menagerie by Tennessee Williams
For Love or Money by F. Hugh Herbert
The First Mrs. Fraser by St. John Ervine
The Road to Rome by Robert E. Sherwood
Kind Lady by Edward Chodorov

1949
Petticoat Fever by Mark Reed
Command Decision by William Wister Haines
Arms and the Man by George Bernard Shaw
Art and Mrs. Bottle by Benn Levy
The Importance of Being Earnest by Oscar Wilde
Light Up the Sky by Moss Hart
Arrangement for Strings by Michael Clayton Hutton and Samuel Rosen
Here Today by George Oppenheimer
Blithe Spirit by Noël Coward

1950
Goodbye Again by Allan Scott and George Haight
Clutterbuck by Benn Levy
The Silver Whistle by Robert E. McEnroe
Our Town by Thornton Wilder
The Front Page by Ben Hecht and Charles MacArthur
Arsenic and Old Lace by Joseph Kesselring
Summer and Smoke by Tennessee Williams
Claudia by Rose Franken
Born Yesterday by Garson Kanin

1951
On Borrowed Time by Paul Osborn
The Petrified Forest by Robert E. Sherwood
Room Service by John Murray and Allen Boretz
Come Back, Little Sheba by William Inge
The Voice of the Turtle by John Van Druten
Susan and God by Rachel Crothers
Second Threshold by Philip Barry
Ring Round the Moon by Jean Anouilh, translation by Christopher Fry

1952
The Lady's Not for Burning by Christopher Fry
Strike a Match by Robert Smith
The Corn Is Green by Emlyn Williams
The Happy Time by Samuel A. Taylor
Affairs of State by Louis Verneuil
Season in the Sun by Wolcott Gibbs
Time for Elizabeth by Groucho Marx and Norman Krasna
Remains to be Seen by Howard Lindsay and Russel Crouse
The Moon Is Blue by F. Hugh Herbert

1953
Don Juan In Hell by George Bernard Shaw
Dial M for Murder by Frederick Knott
You Never Can Tell by George Bernard Shaw
Stalag 17 by Donald Bevan and Edmund Trzcinski
The Dazzling Hour by Anna Bonacci
My Three Angels by Sam and Bella Spewack
Jane by S. N. Behrman, based on an original story by W. Somerset Maugham
I Am a Camera by John Van Druten

1954
The Vacant Lot by Paul Streger and Berrilla Kerr
The Seven Year Itch by George Axelrod
Sabrina Fair by Samuel A. Taylor
Anniversary Waltz by Jerome Chodorov and Joseph Fields
The Winslow Boy by Terence Rattigan

1955
Oh, Men! Oh, Women! by Edward Chodorov
The Time of the Cuckoo by Arthur Laurents
Native Uprising by D. N. Roman
The Rainmaker by N. Richard Nash

1956
The Little Hut by André Roussin
Pal Joey by John O'Hara, music by Richard Rodgers, lyrics by Lorenz Hart
Miss Julie & The Stronger by August Strindberg
King of Hearts by Jean Kerr and Eleanor Brooke
Bus Stop by William Inge

1957
Androcles and the Lion / The Proposal by George Bernard Shaw / Anton Chekhov
Career by James Lee
The Potting Shed by Graham Greene
Paul and Constantine by Dario Bellini
The Reluctant Debutante by William Douglas-Home

1958
Visit to a Small Planet by Gore Vidal
A View from the Bridge by Arthur Miller
Bell, Book and Candle by John Van Druten

1959
Too Many Husbands by W. Somerset Maugham
Once More, with Feeling! by Harry Kurnitz
Two for the Seesaw by William Gibson
Who Was That Lady I Saw You With? by Norman Krasna
Look Homeward, Angel by Ketti Frings, based on the novel by Thomas Wolfe

1983
Romeo and Juliet by William Shakespeare
A Mad World, My Masters by Barrie Keeffe
The Visions of Simone Machard by Bertolt Brecht

1984
As You Like It by William Shakespeare
War Babies by Robert C. Coe
Maybe I'm Doing It Wrong by Randy Newman
Big River: The Adventures of Huckleberry Finn by William Hauptman, music and lyrics by Roger Miller

1985
The Seagull by Anton Chekhov
Ghost on Fire by Michael Weller
A Man's a Man by Bertolt Brecht
Merrily We Roll Along by George Furth, music and lyrics by Stephen Sondheim

1986
Ajax by Sophocles, adapted by Robert Auletta
Gillette by William Hauptman
Figaro Gets a Divorce  by Ödön von Horváth
The Three Cuckolds by Leon Katz
Shout Up a Morning by Paul Avila Mayer and George W. George, music by Julian Adderley and Nathaniel Adderley, lyrics by Diane Charlotte Lampert

1987
Silent Edward by Des McAnuff
The Tempest by William Shakespeare
The School for Wives by Molière, translation by Richard Wilbur
A Walk in the Woods by Lee Blessing
Hedda Gabler by Henrik Ibsen
The Matchmaker by Thornton Wilder

1988
80 Days by Snoo Wilson, music and lyrics by Ray Davies
The Fool Show by Geoff Hoyle
Lulu by Frank Wedekind
Two Rooms by Lee Blessing
Once in a Lifetime by Moss Hart and George S. Kaufman

1989
The Man Who Had No Story by Oana-Marie Hock
Macbeth by William Shakespeare
The Misanthrope by Molière
Down the Road by Lee Blessing
Dangerous Games - Two Tango Pieces by Jim Lewis and Graciela Daniele, lyrics by William Finn, music by Astor Piazzolla
Nebraska by Keith Reddin
The Grapes of Wrath by John Steinbeck

1990
Twelfth Night by William Shakespeare
My Children! My Africa! by Athol Fugard
Don Quixote De La Jolla by Eric Overmyer
A Funny Thing Happened on the Way to the Forum by Burt Shevelove and Larry Gelbart, music and lyrics by Stephen Sondheim
Life During Wartime by Keith Reddin
The Cherry Orchard by Anton Chekhov

1991
Elmer Gantry by John Bishop, music by Mel Marvin, lyrics by Bob Satuloff
A Lesson from Aloes by Athol Fugard
The Heliotrope Bouquet by Eric Overmyer
The Regard of Flight and The Clown Bagatelles by Bill Irwin
Fortinbras by Lee Blessing
Three Sisters by Anton Chekhov

1992
Much Ado About Nothing by William Shakespeare
The Swan by Elizabeth Egloff
Marisol by José Rivera
Playland by Athol Fugard
What the Butler Saw by Joe Orton
The Who's Tommy by Pete Townshend
Le Petomane - A Comedy of Airs by Paul Magid
The Glass Menagerie by Tennessee Williams

1993
Sweet & Hot: The Songs of Harold Arlen, music by Harold Arlen, lyrics by Harold Arlen, Truman Capote, Ira Gershwin, Yip Harburg, Ted Koehler, Johnny Mercer, Leo Robin, Billy Rose and Jack Yellen
The Mission by Richard Montoya, Ric Salinas, and Herbert Siguenza
Luck, Pluck & Virtue by James Lapine
The Hairy Ape by Eugene O'Neill
Arms and the Man by George Bernard Shaw
Children of Paradise: Shooting a Dream by Steven Epp, Felicity Jones, Dominique Serrand and Paul Walsh

1994
How to Succeed in Business Without Really Trying by Abe Burrows, Jack Weinstock, and Willie Gilbert, music and lyrics by Frank Loesser
Mump and Smoot in Ferno by Michael Kennard and John Turner
The Good Person of Setzuan by Bertolt Brecht
Thérèse Raquin by Neal Bell
The Triumph of Love by Pierre Carlet de Chamblain de Marivaux
Harvey by Mary Chase

1995
Randy Newman's Faust, book, music, lyrics by Randy Newman
An Almost Holy Picture by Heather McDonald
Slavs! Thinking about the Longstanding Problems of Virtue and Happiness by Tony Kushner
A Midsummer Night's Dream by William Shakespeare
Cloud Tectonics by José Rivera
The Invisible Circus/Le Cirque Invisible by Victoria Chaplin

1996
Valley Song by Athol Fugard
Boy by Diana Son
The Green Bird by Carlo Gozzi
Happy Days by Samuel Beckett
Yanks & Frogs by Theatre de la Jeune Lune
2.5 Minute Ride by Lisa Krion

1997
Harmony by Bruce Sussman, music by Barry Manilow
Having Our Say by Emily Mann
The Model Apartment by Donald Margulies
Rent by Jonathan Larson
The School for Wives by Molière
The Importance of Being Earnest by Oscar Wilde

1998
Maricela De La Luz Lights the World by José Rivera
Dogeaters by Jessica Hagedorn
Light Up the Sky by Moss Hart
Improbable Theatre's 70 Hill Lane by Phelim McDermott
The Captain's Tiger: A Memoir for the Stage by Athol Fugard
Guitar Lessons: The Springhill Singing Disaster by Karen Trott
Nora by Henrik Ibsen, adapted by Ingmar Bergman

1999
The Flimflam Man by Melanie Marnich
Sweet Bird of Youth by Tennessee Williams
Wonderland by Chay Yew
Pretty Fire by Charlayne Woodard
Jane Eyre by John Caird and Paul Gordon
Loot by Joe Orton
Oo-Bla-Dee by Regina Taylor

2000
Alice's Wild Ride by Karen Hartman
Thoroughly Modern Millie by Richard Morris and Dick Scanlan, music by Jeanine Tesori
Going to St. Ives by Lee Blessing
The Cosmonaut's Last Message to the Woman He Once Loved in the Former Soviet Union by David Greig
Sheridan, or Schooled In Scandal by David Grimm
Lifegame by Keith Johnstone
Blood Wedding by Federico García Lorca, translation by David Johnston

2001
The Origin of Corn / El Origen De Maiz by Ralph Lee
Dracula, The Musical by Christopher Hampton and Don Black, music by Frank Wildhorn
Diva by Howard Gould
The Laramie Project by Moisés Kaufman and Leigh Fondakowski
Be Aggressive by Annie Weisman
I Am My Own Wife by Doug Wright
The Collected Works of Billy The Kid by Michael Ondaatje
Our Town by Thornton Wilder

2002
Ladybird: The Life and Time of a Roller Derby Queen by Luis Alfaro
Mabou Mines' Peter and Wendy by J. M. Barrie
Adoration of the Old Woman by José Rivera
I Think I Like Girls by Leigh Fondakowski
Wintertime by Charles L. Mee
When Grace Comes In by Heather McDonald
A Feast of Fools by Geoff Hoyle, music by Gina Leishman
Tartuffe by Molière, translation by Richard Wilbur

2003
The Breeze, the Gust, the Gale, and the Wind by Hilly Hicks
The Comedy of Errors by William Shakespeare
Beauty by Tina Landau
Eden Lane by Tom Donaghy
The Country by Martin Crimp
The Burning Deck by Sarah Schulman
Fräulein Else by Arthur Schnitzler
Uncle Vanya by Anton Chekhov

2004
Guitar by Julia Jordan
Private Fittings by Georges Feydeau, adapted by Mark O'Donnell
Jersey Boys by Marshall Brickman and Rick Elice, music by Bob Gaudio, lyrics by Bob Crewe
The Love of Three Oranges by Carlo Gozzi, adaptation by James Magruder
Paris Commune by Steve Cosson and Michael Friedman
Suitcase by Melissa James Gibson
Continental Divide: Mothers Against and Daughters of the Revolution by David Edgar
700 Sundays / Billy Crystal / A Life In Progress by Billy Crystal

2005
Pop Tour: Bay and the Spectacles of Doom by Julia Cho
Palm Beach, The Screwball Musical by Robert Cary and Benjamin Feldman, music by David Gursky
Zhivago by Michael Weller, music by Lucy Simon, lyrics by Michael Korie and Amy Powers
Current Nobody by Melissa James Gibson
I Am My Own Wife by Doug Wright
The Scottish Play by Lee Blessing
The Miser by Molière
Much Ado About Nothing by William Shakespeare
Pop Tour: West of the 5 by Sunil Kuruvilla

2006
Zhivago by Michael Weller, music by Lucy Simon, lyrics by Michael Korie and Amy Powers
Mother Courage and Her Children by Bertolt Brecht
All Wear Bowlers by Geoff Sobelle and Trey Lyford
Culture Clash's Zorro in Hell by Richard Montoya, Ric Salinas and Herbert Sigüenza
The Wiz by William F. Brown, music and lyrics by Charlie Smalls
The Farnsworth Invention by Aaron Sorkin, music by Andrew Lippa

2007/08
Carmen by Sarah Miles, music by John Ewbank
The Deception, adapted from La Fausse Suivante by Pierre Marivaux
After the Quake by Haruki Murakami
The Adding Machine by Elmer Rice
Cry-Baby by John Waters
The Seven by Will Power, music by Will Power, Will Hammond, Justin Ellington
Most Wanted by Jessica Hagedorn, music by Mark Bennett

2008/09
33 Variations by Moisés Kaufman
The Night Watcher by Charlayne Woodard
Memphis (musical) by Joe DiPietro
The Third Story by Charles Busch
Tobacco Road by Erskine Caldwell
Xanadu by Douglas Carter Beane
The Edge Series

2009/10
Unusual Acts of Devotion by Terrence McNally
Creditors, adapted and directed by Doug Wright
Restoration
Herringbone
The 39 Steps
Bonnie & Clyde by Frank Wildhorn, Don Black and Ivan Menchel
Aurélia's Oratorio by Aurélia Thierrée Chaplin
The Laramie Project: Ten Years Later, directed by Darko Tresnjak
The Edge Series: Dogugaeshi and HOOVER COMES ALIVE!

2010/11
Surf Report by Annie Weisman
A Midsummer Night's Dream by William Shakespeare
Limelight: The Story of Charlie Chaplin by Christopher Curtis and Thomas Meehan
Notes from Underground, adapted by Bill Camp and Robert Woodruff from the novel by Fyodor Dostoevsky
Ruined by Lynn Nottage
Little Miss Sunshine, music and lyrics by William Finn; Book and Direction by James Lapine

2011/12
A Dram of Drummhicit by Arthur Kopit and Anton Dudley
Peer Gynt by Henrik Ibsen and adapted by David Schweitzer
Sleeping Beauty Wakes, music and lyrics by Brendan Milburn and Valerie Vigoda Book by Rachel Sheinken
Milk Like Sugar by Kirsten Greenidge
Jesus Christ Superstar, music by Andrew Lloyd Webber, lyrics by Tim Rice
American Night: The Ballad of Juan José by Richard Montoya

2012/13
Hands on a Hardbody, music by Trey Anastasio and Amanda Green, lyrics by Amanda Green, book by Doug Wright
Blood and Gifts by J. T. Rogers
The Nightingale, music and lyrics by Duncan Sheik and Steven Sater, book by Steven Sater
An Iliad by Homer, adapted by Denis O'Hare and Lisa Peterson
Glengarry Glen Ross by David Mamet
Yoshimi Battles the Pink Robots by Wayne Coyne and Des McAnuff

2013/14
His Girl Friday by Ben Hecht and Charles MacArthur, adapted by John Guare
Tribes by Nina Raine
Sideways, book by Rex Pickett
The Tallest Tree in the Forest by Daniel Beaty
Side Show, music by Henry Krieger, book and lyrics by Bill Russell
The Who & The What by Ayad Akhtar

2014/15
Chasing the Song, book by Joe DiPietro, music by David Bryan, lyrics by Joe DiPietro and David Bryan
The Orphan of Zhao, adapted by James Fenton
Ether Dome by Elizabeth Egloff
Kingdom City by Sheri Wilner
The Hunchback of Notre Dame, novel by Victor Hugo, music by Alan Menken, lyrics by Stephen Schwartz

2015/16
Come from Away, book, music, and lyrics by Irene Sankoff and David Hein
Up Here, book, music, and lyrics by Robert Lopez and Kristen Anderson-Lopez
Blueprints to Freedom by Michael Benjamin Washington
Healing Wars by Liz Lerman
Indecent by Paula Vogel
Guards at the Taj by Rajiv Joseph

2016/17
Latin History for Dummies, created and performed by John Leguizamo
Hollywood by Joe DiPietro
The Last Tiger in Haiti by Jeff Augustin
Junk: The Golden Age of Debt by Ayad Akhtar
Tiger Style! by Mike Lew
Miss You Like Hell, book by Quiara Alegría Hudes, music by Erin McKeown, lyrics by Quiara Alegría Hudes and Erin McKeown
Freaky Friday, book by Bridget Carpenter, music and lyrics by Tom Kitt and Brian Yorkey, based on the novel by Mary Rodgers

2017/18
Escape to Margaritaville – book by Greg Garcia and Mike O'Malley, music and lyrics by Jimmy Buffett
At the Old Place – by Rachel Bonds
Kill Local – by Mat Smart
Wild Goose Dreams – by Hansol Jung
SUMMER: The Donna Summer Musical – book by Colman Domingo, Robert Cary, and Des McAnuff
Mike Birbiglia: The New One – by Mike Birbiglia
The Cake – by Bekah Brunstetter
Home of the Brave – by Lee Cataluna

External links
La Jolla Playhouse official website
California Arts Council
Christopher Ashley, La Jolla Playhouse Artistic Director – Downstage Center interview at American Theatre Wing.org, October 2007

Theatre company production histories
Culture of San Diego